The Ducrest Building, also known as DeBailion's Pharmacy, is a historic commercial building located at 100 West Main Street in Broussard, Louisiana.

Built in 1903 by T. Lucien Ducrest which operated a pharmacy there, the building is a two-story frame commercial building in Italianate style.

The building was listed on the National Register of Historic Places on March 14, 1983.

It is one of 10 individually NRHP-listed houses in the "Broussard Multiple Resource Area", which also includes: 
Alesia House
Billeaud House
Martial Billeaud Jr. House  
Valsin Broussard House 
Comeaux House 

Janin Store 
Roy-LeBlanc House 
St. Cecilia School 
St. Julien House 
Main Street Historic District

See also
 National Register of Historic Places listings in Lafayette Parish, Louisiana

References

Commercial buildings on the National Register of Historic Places in Louisiana
Italianate architecture in Louisiana
Commercial buildings completed in 1903
Lafayette Parish, Louisiana
National Register of Historic Places in Lafayette Parish, Louisiana